The Schmon River is a river in the Côte-Nord region of the province of Quebec, Canada. It flows south into Lake Walker.

Location

The Schmon River has its source in Lac au Vent and Lac aux Mouches.
It flows south for almost  to Lake Walker.
For most of its length it flows through the Port-Cartier–Sept-Îles Wildlife Reserve.
The lower section meanders through the proposed Lake Walker National Park. 
The Schmon river flows through land that is mostly covered in coniferous forests.

Name

The river was called Rivière aux Rochers Nord-Ouest until 1975, when it was renamed in honor of Arthur A. Schmon (1895–1964) of Newark, New Jersey, a leading figure in the paper industry.
The river flows through Lake Schmon close to its source.

Route

The Schmon River is one of the main tributaries of Lake Walker.
Originally the valley was V-shaped, but the glacial tongues that occupied it several times during the Quaternary transformed it into a well-defined trough.
Along its length the Schmon river valley shows a series of glacial barriers and accumulation basins.
For example, the valley broadens out to the south of the Saint-Joseph Creek to more than double its width lower down.

In the last  of its length the river has several areas of past of present meanders.
The glacial meltwater transported and deposited glaciofluvial sediments in this valley.
These sediments were taken up, eroded and then transported downstream by deltaic and fluvial processes. 
The land on either side of the river has high terraces above the river, below which are progressively lower alluvial terraces.

Environment

The region is in the Köppen climate classification's boreal climate zone.
A map of the Ecological regions of Quebec shows the river rising and flowing south through the eastern spruce/moss domain of the boreal zone.

Notes

Sources

Rivers of Côte-Nord